Sir Kenneth Ralph Barnes (11 September 1878 – 16 October 1957) was director of the Royal Academy of Dramatic Art (RADA) in London, from 1909-55.

Born at Heavitree, near Exeter, the youngest of six children of Rev. Reginald Henry Barnes (1831–1889), Prebendary of Exeter Cathedral and Vicar of Heavitree, and his wife, Frances Mary Emily, née Nation. His sisters, Irene and Violet both became actresses.

In 1921 he instigated the building of a new theatre for RADA which was demolished by bombing in 1941. A new Vanbrugh Theatre was opened by Queen Elizabeth The Queen Mother in 1954 shortly before Sir Kenneth's retirement. He was knighted in 1938.

References

1878 births
1957 deaths
People educated at Westminster School, London
People from Exeter
British theatre directors
Alumni of Christ Church, Oxford
People associated with RADA

Knights Bachelor